The Nugget Newspaper is an independent weekly newspaper published in Sisters, Oregon, United States with a print readership of 12,100 and a circulation of 8,000. The online edition at nuggetnews.com claims a readership of 9,500 readers per month. The newspaper publishes a companion magazine annually, The Sisters Oregon Guide; its circulation is not listed. 
The Nugget states its founding date as 1978, while the Library of Congress lists its founding date as 1988. The editor in chief, as of 2018, is Jim Cornelius, who started in 1994. The Nugget is an associate member of the Oregon Newspaper Publishers Association.

The newspaper was sold to new J. Louis Mullen and Tom Mullen, newspaper publishers who had bought several newspapers in Wyoming and Washington since 2013, in 2017.

References

External links
Nugget Newspaper (official website)

1978 establishments in Oregon
Newspapers published in Oregon
Oregon Newspaper Publishers Association
Newspapers established in 1978
Sisters, Oregon